Chris Jericho's Rock 'N' Wrestling Rager at Sea is a series of cruise ship experiences held by professional wrestler, musician, author and actor Chris Jericho. The experience features professional wrestling events, musical concerts, stand-up comedy, and podcasts. The original cruise took place in October 2018. Two months later, Jericho confirmed there would be a second cruise to be held in 2020. Jericho partnered with Ring of Honor to hold the cruise's wrestling event in 2018 and with All Elite Wrestling for his 2020 and 2021 cruise.

2018
Chris Jericho's Rock 'N' Wrestling Rager at Sea was a professional wrestling and rock music-themed Norwegian Jade cruise that sailed from October 27 to October 31, 2018 hosted by Chris Jericho.

Guests

 Chris Jericho

Ring of Honor
 Kenny Omega
 The Young Bucks
 Dalton Castle
 Marty Scurll
 The Briscoes
 Brandi Rhodes
 Mandy Leon
 Adam Page
 Jay Lethal
 Matt Taven
 Christopher Daniels
 Frankie Kazarian
 Flip Gordon
 Kenny King
 Silas Young
 Beer City Bruiser
 Delirious
 Cheeseburger
 Scorpio Sky
 Rhett Titus
 Will Ferrara
 Sumie Sakai
 Cody
 Jenny Rose

Impact Wrestling
 Sami Callihan
 Johnny Impact
 Brian Cage
 Melissa Santos

Wrestling
 Jim Ross
 Jerry Lawler
 Diamond Dallas Page
 Mick Foley
 Ricky Steamboat
 Rey Mysterio
 Raven
 James Ellsworth
 SoCal Val (Guest Cruise Director)
 Noelle Foley
 Pat Patterson

Podcasts
 Talk Is Jericho
 Busted Open Radio (Dave LaGreca and Bubba Ray Dudley)
 Keepin It 100 Podcast (Konnan, Disco Inferno, and Hurricane Helms)
 Killing the Town Podcast (Cyrus and Paul Lazenby)
 Unprofessional Wrestling Shows (Colt Cabana and Marty DeRosa)
 Beyond the Darkness (Dave Schrader)
 What Say You? (Sal Vulcano and Brian Quinn)

Music
 Corey Taylor
 Phil Campbell and the Bastard Sons
 Kyng
 Fozzy
 The Stir
 Cherry Bombs
 Shoot to Thrill
 Blizzard of Ozzy
 Dave Spivak Project
 Papa Buck

Comedy
 Craig Gass
 Brad Williams

Sea of Honor

Results

Other on-screen personnel

2020

Second Wave

Chris Jericho's Rock 'N' Wrestling Rager at Sea Part Deux: Second Wave was a professional wrestling and rock music-themed Norwegian Pearl cruise that sailed from January 20 to January 24, 2020 hosted by Chris Jericho and Gabriel Iglesias. In collaboration with All Elite Wrestling (AEW) for their Bash at the Beach event, matches from the second night of the cruise were taped and aired on the January 22 episode of AEW Dynamite.

Guests

All Elite Wrestling
 Chris Jericho (Master of Ceremonies)
 Kenny Omega
 The Young Bucks
 Jon Moxley
 MJF
 Sammy Guevara
 Jake Hager
 Santana and Ortiz
 Pac
 Adam Page
 SoCal Uncensored
 Riho
 Allie
 Britt Baker
 Luchasaurus
 Jungle Boy
 Marko Stunt
 Joey Janela
 Nyla Rose
 Penelope Ford
 Private Party
 Darby Allin
 Priscilla Kelly
 Justin Roberts
 Q. T. Marshall
 Kip Sabian
 Cody

Special guests
 Ric Flair (Guest of Honor)
 Gabriel Iglesias (Host)
 Vickie Guerrero (Guest Cruise Director)
 Scott Hall
 Sean Waltman
 Booker T
 Jake Roberts
 Diamond Dallas Page
 Eric Bischoff
 Conrad Thompson
 Chavo Guerrero Jr.
 Sharmell
 MVP
 Lisa Marie Varon
 Shaul Guerrero
 Ted Irvine
 Red Cup Geoff
 Jack Slade

Podcasts
 Talk Is Jericho
 Wrestling Observer Live & Wrestling Observer Radio (Bryan Alvarez and Dave Meltzer)
 83 Weeks (Eric Bischoff)
 The Hall of Fame (Booker T and Brad Gilmore)
 Beyond the Darkness (Dave Schrader)
 Excuse Me: The Vickie Guerrero Show

Music
 Light the Torch
 Jared James Nichols
 Kick Axe
 Farewell to Fear
 Dark Sky Choir
 The Killer Queens
 Rubix Kube
 Dave Spivak Project
 The Vaudettes
 Fozzy

Comedy
 Bruce Jingles
 Craig Gass

Results

Other on-screen personnel

2021

Triple Whammy

Chris Jericho's Rock 'N' Wrestling Rager at Sea Triple Whammy was a professional wrestling and rock music-themed Norwegian Jewel cruise that sailed from October 21 to October 25, 2021 hosted by Chris Jericho. It was previously scheduled to take place from February 1 to February 5, 2021 with a live episode of AEW Dynamite airing on February 3, but was delayed due to the COVID-19 pandemic.

Guests

All Elite Wrestling
 Chris Jericho (Master of Ceremonies)
 Dr. Britt Baker DMD
 Orange Cassidy
 Chuck Taylor
 Wheeler Yuta
 Kris Statlander
 Marko Stunt
 Will Hobbs
 Ricky Starks
 Frankie Kazarian
 Christopher Daniels
 Anna Jay
 Dasha Gonzalez
 Brian Cage
 Isaiah Kassidy
 Angelico
 Stu Grayson
 Evil Uno
 Colt Cabana
 Ryan Nemeth
 J.D. Drake
 Cesar Bononi
 Billy Gunn
 Austin Gunn
 Colton Gunn
 Dr. Luther
 Serpentico
 Sonny Kiss
 Abadon
 Jamie Hayter
 Rebel
 Will Ospreay
 Danhausen
 Kurt Angle
 Jake Roberts
 Ricky Morton
 Robert Gibson
 Jazz
 Madusa
 Aubrey Edwards

Referees
 Aubrey Edwards

Special guests
 Kurt Angle (Guest of Honor)
 Danhausen
 Bully Ray
 Billy Gunn
 Dante
 Jazz
 Dean Malenko
 Will Ospreay
 Brad Williams (Guest Host)
 Madusa (Guest Cruise Director)
 Ted Irvine
 The Rock 'n' Roll Express
 Suge D (aka Pineapple Pete)

Podcasts
 Talk is Jericho
 Darkness Radio

Music
 Fozzy
 Stryper
 Crobot
 Rubix Kube
 The Vaudettes
 Marko Stunt

Comedy
 Brad Williams
 Ryan Niemiller

Results

Championships and accomplishments

Current championship

Oceanic Championship Tournament
The inaugural Oceanic Championship Tournament was held between February 2nd and February 5th 2023.

List of winners

References

External links

2018 in professional wrestling
2020 in professional wrestling
2021 in professional wrestling
Music cruises
Professional wrestling shows
All Elite Wrestling
Ring of Honor